is a Japanese screenwriter. He was nominated for an Academy Award in the category Best Adapted Screenplay for the film Drive My Car.

Selected filmography 
 Drive My Car (2021; co-nominated with Ryusuke Hamaguchi)

References

External links 

1981 births
Living people
Japanese screenwriters
Kindai University alumni
Writers from Osaka Prefecture